National Skills Development Authority is a Bangladesh government agency under the Prime Minister's Office responsible for developing policies to build a skilled labour force. The authority must approve and evaluate all skill development projects of the government. The chairperson of the governing body of the National Skills Development Authority is Prime Minister Sheikh Hasina and the vice-chairperson is Minister of Finance A H M Mustafa Kamal. The principal secretary of the Prime Minister's Office, Ahmad Kaikaus, is the chairperson of the executive committee of National Skills Development Authority.

History
In 2008, the Government of Bangladesh formed the National Skills Development Council under the Ministry of Labour and Employment. On 16 January 2019, the government dismantled the National Skills Development Council and formed the National Skills Development Authority. The authority was formed under the National Skills Development Authority Act-2018, which was passed through the parliament. The authority is headed by a chairperson with the rank of secretary. The authority also inherited all the obligations, contracts, and liabilities of the National Skills Development Council.

References

2019 establishments in Bangladesh
Organisations based in Dhaka
Government agencies of Bangladesh
Research institutes in Bangladesh